"Young Bloods" is a song by the Los Angeles-based punk rock band The Bronx, released as the first single from their 2008 album The Bronx.

While the album was released by Original Signal Records and the band's own White Drugs label, the singles for all of their albums have been released exclusively in the United Kingdom, through Wichita Recordings. The single was released on 7-inch vinyl and limited to 1,500 copies. The B-side song, "Lab Rats", is an outtake from the album's recording sessions. The cover artwork was designed by guitarist Joby J. Ford.

The music video for "Young Bloods" was directed by French visual artist Lokiss. Mike Piscitelli had directed four of the band's five previous music videos, but was unable to work on "Young Bloods" due to being on a project in Africa. The video shows lucha libre-style wrestlers practicing and sparring in a room. It failed a Harding Test for broadcast in the United Kingdom due to numerous flashes and strobes which could potentially cause seizures in viewers. The band posted the results of the test to their website, noting that "of course we don't wish this upon anyone and feel a bit weird posting something like this. But - the interesting fact is no other broadcast has failed as miserably as our video."

Track listing

CD version

Vinyl version

Personnel

Band
 Matt Caughthran – lead vocals
 Joby J. Ford – guitar, backing vocals, artwork and design
 Ken Horne – guitar, backing vocals
 Brad Magers – bass guitar, backing vocals
 Jorma Vik – drums

Production
 Dave Schiffman – producer, recording, mixing engineer
 Howie Weinberg – mastering

See also
The Bronx discography

References

The Bronx (band) songs
2009 singles
2008 songs